Nicholas Sergeyevitch Timasheff (November 9, 1886 – March 9, 1970) was a Russian sociologist, professor of jurisprudence and writer.

Biography
Timasheff "came from an old family of Russian nobility"; his father was Minister of Trade and Industry under Nicholas II. In St. Petersburg, where he was born, he attended a classical high school; he went on to attend the Tsarskoye Selo Lyceum, the University of Strasbourg, and the Saint Petersburg State University (MA 1910, LLD 1914). At the latter university he met the Polish-Russian jurist Leon Petrazycki, who was a significant influence on him throughout his life. Two years later he began teaching sociological jurisprudence at the University of Petrograd. He emigrated to the United States following an alleged involvement with the Tagantsev Conspiracy in 1921. He joined the Harvard University Sociology Department, chaired at that time by P. A. Sorokin, and later transitioned to sociology faculty of Fordham University, where he would remain for the rest of his career.

Timasheff was the author of various works, including The Great Retreat: The Growth and Decline of Communism in Russia (New York, 1946), in which he argued that the Bolsheviks made a conscious retreat from socialist values during the 1930s, instead returning to traditional ones like patriotism and the family. Historian Terry Martin considers this a misnomer, because "in the political and economic spheres, the period after 1933 marked a consolidation, rather than a repudiation, of the most important goals of Stalin's socialist offensive: forced industrialization, collectivization, nationalization, abolition of the market, political dictatorship."

Buried: Oakland Cemetery (Yonkers, New York) Westchester County, USA.

References

Sources 
Roman Goul, "N. S. Timasheff 1886-1970," Russian Review 29 no. 3 (July, 1970): 363-365.

1886 births
1970 deaths
People from Sankt-Peterburgsky Uyezd
Russian nobility
Russian Christians
Russian sociologists
Tagantsev conspiracy
Russian anti-communists
Academic staff of Saint Petersburg State University
Harvard University faculty
White Russian emigrants to the United States